It was a Dacian fortified town.

References

Dacian fortresses in Sibiu County
Historic monuments in Sibiu County